Eukaryotic initiation factor 4A-III is a protein that in humans is encoded by the EIF4A3 gene.

Function 

This gene encodes a member of the DEAD box protein family. DEAD box proteins, characterized by the conserved motif Asp-Glu-Ala-Asp (DEAD), are putative RNA helicases. They are implicated in a number of cellular processes involving alteration of RNA secondary structure, such as translation initiation, nuclear and mitochondrial splicing, and ribosome and spliceosome assembly. Based on their distribution patterns, some members of this family are believed to be involved in embryogenesis, spermatogenesis, and cellular growth and division. The protein encoded by this gene is a nuclear matrix protein. Its amino acid sequence is highly similar to the amino acid sequences of the translation initiation factors eIF4A-I and eIF4A-II, two other members of the DEAD box protein family.

References

Further reading